S.K.J Law College is a law college of Babasaheb Bhimrao Ambedkar Bihar University, Muzaffarpur, Bihar (B.R.A.B.U). This is a government law college of Bihar state. This college is also known as Sri Krishna Jubilee Law College.

Location
S.K.J Law College is in Gannipur, Muzaffarpur district.

How to reach
Ram Dayalu Nagar Station is the nearest railway station to the college. 950 meter distance from Ram Dayalu Nagar Station to the S.K.J Law College.National highway 77 (NH 77) is the nearest national highway and Road distance from Gannipur road Muzaffarpur to S.K.J Law College is about 180 meters (walking distance approximate 1 minute).

References

Law schools in Bihar
Universities and colleges in Bihar
Muzaffarpur district
1948 establishments in India
Educational institutions established in 1948